Bruce Balcom is a Canadian material scientist and chemist, currently a Canada Research Chair at University of New Brunswick

References

Year of birth missing (living people)
Living people
Academic staff of the University of New Brunswick
Canadian physicists
Canadian materials scientists
Mount Allison University alumni
University of Western Ontario alumni